Kelly of the Secret Service is a 1936 American mystery film produced by Sam Katzman. Directed by Robert F. Hill, it stars Lloyd Hughes, Jack Mulhall and Sheila Bromley.

References

External links
Kelly of the Secret Service at IMDb

1936 films
1930s English-language films
Victory Pictures films
Films directed by Robert F. Hill
1930s mystery films
American mystery films
American black-and-white films
1936 drama films
1930s American films